Aleksanteri Keisala (31 May 1916 – 15 May 1983) was a Finnish wrestler. He competed at the 1948 Summer Olympics and the 1952 Summer Olympics.

References

External links
 

1916 births
1983 deaths
Finnish male sport wrestlers
Olympic wrestlers of Finland
Wrestlers at the 1948 Summer Olympics
Wrestlers at the 1952 Summer Olympics
People from Lapua
Sportspeople from South Ostrobothnia
20th-century Finnish people
World Wrestling Championships medalists